Nasturtium floridanum, common names Florida yellowcress and Florida watercress, is an aquatic plant species endemic to Florida, though widely distributed within that state. It is found in wet places at elevations less than 50 m.

Nasturtium floridanum can be distinguished from the more common N. officinale  by its much smaller seeds, less than 2 mm across.

References

photo of herbarium specimen at Missouri Botanical Garden, serving as isolectotpe of Cardamine curvisiliqua and Nasturtium floridanum

floridanum
Freshwater plants
Herbs
Leaf vegetables
Medicinal plants
Perennial vegetables
Flora of Florida
Plants described in 1988
Plants described in 1887